Long travel suspension is a type of vehicle suspension often used in off road racing. Vehicles such as dune buggies, baja racers and rock crawlers use long travel suspension to dampen the effects of, rough, off-road driving conditions.

Long travel suspension accessories 
 Bump Stops – Prevents suspension from bottoming out.
 Limit Straps – Prevents shocks from extending all the way out.
 Sway Bars – Stabilizes vehicle around hard turns.
 Coilover Springs – Usually placed over the load-bearing struts, hence the name coilover.

Desert and rock racing suspension

References 

Automotive suspension technologies
Off-road racing